The West Nakdong River (Rakdong in North Korean) is river in South Korea.

Geography
The Nakdong is Distributary of Nakdong River.

Tributary 
Joman River(조만강)
Pyeonggang River(평강천)

See also
Geography of South Korea
List of rivers of Asia
Nakdong River

References

Rivers of South Korea
Rivers of South Gyeongsang Province
Rivers of Busan
Distributaries